Jeff Bell (born 16 November 1978, Timaru) is a New Zealand cartoonist and caricaturist. His work appears every Monday in the Dominion Post, the Press, and other Stuff Ltd newspapers.

Biography 
Bell cites Murray Webb, Mad Magazine and Spitting Image as key influences on his work.

Bell has contributed regular cartoons to Stuff newspapers since 2017 and has contributed to other New Zealand publications including the Listener, the Manawatu Standard, Ashburton Guardian, Avenues magazine, Pavement magazine, and the Christchurch Mail. He was a finalist in Next in Line Young Cartoonist Award in 2013.

Exhibitions 
 Next in line, National Library of New Zealand (2013)
 Stretching the Truth, Chamber Gallery Rangiora (2016)
 Ludicrous Likenesses, the fine art of caricature, New Zealand Portrait Gallery (2017)

References 

New Zealand cartoonists
New Zealand caricaturists
1978 births
Living people